The Zacatecas harvest mouse (Reithrodontomys zacatecae) is a species of rodent in the family Cricetidae.
It is found only in Mexico.

References

Musser, G. G. and M. D. Carleton. 2005. Superfamily Muroidea. pp. 894–1531 in Mammal Species of the World a Taxonomic and Geographic Reference. D. E. Wilson and D. M. Reeder eds. Johns Hopkins University Press, Baltimore.

Reithrodontomys
Mammals described in 1901
Taxonomy articles created by Polbot